The National Geophysical Research Institute (NGRI) is a geoscientific research organization established in 1961 under the Council of Scientific and Industrial Research (CSIR), India's largest Research and Development organization. It is supported by more than 200 scientists and other technical staff whose research activities are published in several journals of national and international interest.

Research areas covered by this institute include hydrocarbon and coal exploration, mineral exploration, deep seismic sounding studies, exploration and management of groundwater resources, earthquake hazard assessment, structure of earth's interior and its evolution (theoretical studies), geophysical instrument development and geothermal exploration.

The major facilities available at NGRI include: 
Laser Ablation Multi-Collector Inductively Coupled Plasma Mass Spectrometer (LA-MC-ICPMS) with clean chemistry laboratory facility. 
Mineral Physics Laboratory with high-pressure Diamond Anvil Cell (DAC), ultra high resolution (0.02/cm) double monochorometer, and micro-Raman spectrometer. 
High-pressure laboratory consisting of Keithly electrometer, strain-measuring sensors, universal testing machine (100 tons), and Bridgeman-Birch high-pressure apparatus. 
In-situ stress measurement facility consisting of hydraulic equipment. 
Rock magnetism laboratory consisting of astatic magnetometer, digital spinner magnetometer, alternating magnetic field and thermal demagnetizers, high-field and low-field hysteresis  and   susceptibility meter. 
Geochemical laboratory consisting of fully automated X-ray Fluorescence Spectrometer (XRF), Atomic Absorption Spectrometer, Inductively Coupled Plasma Mass Spectrometer (ICPMS), and Electron Probe Micro Analyzer (EPMA). 
Geochronology and isotope geochemistry laboratory with facilities for Rb-Sr, Sm-Nd, and Pb-Pb analyses. 
EM, Resistivity, and IP Model Laboratories. 
Continuous Flow Isotope Ratio Mass Spectrometer Laboratory (CFIRMS). 
Helium Emanometry, Heatflow and Radiometry Laboratory. 
Tritium and carbon dating laboratory for groundwater. 
Centralized computing facilities: PC-LAN and an array of Sun Workstations. 
Thermoluminescence (TR) Optically Stimulated Luminescence (OSL) dating facility. 
Absolute Gravity Lab. 
Airborne magnetic and electromagnetic surveys.

External links
NGRI web site
CSIR web site

Council of Scientific and Industrial Research
Earth science research institutes
Research institutes in Hyderabad, India
1961 establishments in Andhra Pradesh
Research institutes established in 1961
Geophysics organizations